The Council of Rome was a Synod which took place in Rome in AD 382, presumably under the leadership of Pope Damasus I, the then-Bishop of Rome. The so-called  (a work written over a century later by an unknown person between AD 519 and 553) contains a canon of Scripture, which it claims was issued by the Council of Rome under Pope Damasus in 382, and which is identical with the list given at the Council of Trent.

Occasion 

The previous year, the Emperor Theodosius I had appointed the candidate Nectarius as Archbishop of Constantinople. The bishops of the West opposed the election result and asked for a common synod of East and West to settle the succession of the see of Constantinople, and so the Emperor Theodosius, soon after the close of the  First Council of Constantinople in 381, summoned the Imperial bishops to a fresh synod at Constantinople; nearly all of the same bishops who had attended the earlier synod  re-assembled in the early summer of 382. On arrival they received a letter from the synod of Milan, inviting them to a great general council at Rome; they indicated that they must remain where they were, because they had not made any preparations for such long a journey; however, they sent three—Syriacus, Eusebius, and Priscian—with a joint synodal letter to Pope Damasus, Ambrose, archbishop of Milan, and the other bishops assembled in the council at Rome.

Decree 

Jerome mentioned the synod twice, but only in passing.

The Oxford Dictionary of the Christian Church, states:

The Oxford Dictionary of the Christian Church also notes that "according to E. von Dobschütz, the Gelasian Decree is not a Papal work at all, but a private compilation which was composed in Italy (but not at Rome) in the early 6th cent. Other scholars, while accepting this date, think it originated in Gaul."

Catholic apologist and historian William Jurgens writes:

References

Further reading 
 Geoffrey Mark Hahneman, The Muratorian Fragment and the Development of the Canon, Oxford University Press, 1992 - pages 158−161

External links
The "Damasine List"

Rome
Rome
Ancient city of Rome
Development of the Christian biblical canon
4th century in Italy
380s in the Roman Empire
382